Heinrich XLII (27 February 1752 – 17 April 1818) was a German prince of the House of Reuss.

Biography
He succeeded as Count of Reuss-Schleiz on 25 June 1784, and also to Reuss-Gera on 26 April 1802, when the counties were united as Reuss-Schleiz und Gera. On 9 April 1806 the united county was raised to a principality.

References

1752 births
1818 deaths
People from Schleiz
Princes of Reuss